(1958February 2, 2008) was a Japanese musician and sound engineer, best known as the bassist in Keiji Haino's rock group Fushitsusha. He was also a member of the free improvisation group Marginal Consort, and in the past he played with East Bionic Symphonia and Machine-Gun Tango (with Tori Kudo).

Discography 
East Bionic Symphonia (Kojima, 1976)
V.A., Aiyoku jinmin juji gekijo (Pinakotheca, 1980)
Collective Improvisation (PSF, 1998)
Marginal Consort 4CD (Improvised Music from Japan, 2007)
Early Works of Satoshi Sonoda 1977→1978 / Memories of Yasushi Ozawa (PSF, 2009)

with Fushitsusha
Untitled (PSF, 1989)
Untitled (PSF, 1991)
Allegorical Misunderstanding (Avant, 1993)
Pathetique [also known as Hisou] (PSF, 1994)
The Caution Appears (Les Disques de soleil, 1995)
Purple Trap: The Wound That Was Given Birth To Must Be Bigger Than The Wound That Gave Birth (Blast First, 1996)
A Death Never To Be Complete (Tokuma, 1997)
The Time is Nigh (Tokuma, 1997)
Gold Blood (Charnel, 1998)
A Little Longer Thus (Tokuma, 1998)
The Wisdom Prepared (Tokuma, 1998)
Withdrawe, This Sable Disclosure ere Devot'd (Victo, 1998)
I Saw It! That Which Before I Could Only Sense (Paratactile, 2000)
Origin's Hesitation (PSF, 2001)

References

Interview. Taajii, issue 1, 1996
Interview (as a member of Fushitsusha). Opprobrium, issue 3, November 1996

External links
Interview with Ozawa as a member of Fushitsusha

1958 births
2008 deaths
20th-century Japanese musicians
Place of birth missing
20th-century Japanese male musicians